Central Aroostook High School is a public high school in Mars Hill, Maine, United States with 132 students enrolled as of 2019 and 21 full-time teaching staff providing grades 7–12.

References

Schools in Aroostook County, Maine
Public high schools in Maine